The fourteenth season of RuPaul's Drag Race premiered on January 7, 2022. The reality competition series, broadcast on VH1 in the United States, showcases 14 new queens competing for the title of "America's Next Drag Superstar". Casting calls for season 14 were opened in November 2020, and the cast was officially revealed by season 13 winner Symone on VH1 on December 2, 2021. The season premiere received 738,000 viewers, making it the most-watched premiere since Season 10.

The season was won by Willow Pill, who became the first transgender contestant to win the main franchise of RuPaul's Drag Race, and the fourth transgender contestant to win overall, with Lady Camden as the runner-up. Kornbread "The Snack" Jeté was named Miss Congeniality, who became the first transgender contestant to win the title.

The season welcomed Maddy Morphosis, the show's first heterosexual, cisgender male contestant. The season notably also featured five transgender contestants: Kerri Colby and Kornbread "The Snack" Jeté (both of whom entered the competition openly trans), Jasmine Kennedie (who came out as a trans woman during filming of the show), Bosco (who came out as a trans woman as the season aired), and Willow Pill (who came out as trans femme as the season aired).

The season featured a "Chocolate Bar Twist" which was introduced in the third episode, which featured each of the contestants being given a chocolate bar, one of which contained a golden bar. After losing a lip sync, each contestant must unwrap their chocolate bar, and the contestant whose bar contains the golden bar is saved from elimination. The twist lasted until episode 12, when Bosco was revealed to have the golden chocolate bar.

This season had a final five going to the grand finale, a first in the show’s history. Additionally, the winning queen received a cash prize of $150,000, the highest amount awarded to date in a regular season. The runner-up received a $50,000 cash prize. It is also the first series in which a single queen had to lip sync for their life five times; Jorgeous survived four lip syncs and was sent home on the fifth.

Contestants

Ages, names, and cities stated are at time of filming.

Notes

Contestant progress

Lip syncs
Legend:

Notes:

Guest judges

Lizzo, singer and songwriter
Alicia Keys, singer and songwriter
Christine Chiu, businesswoman, philanthropist and television personality
Loni Love, comedian and television host
Ava Max, singer
Taraji P. Henson, actress and singer
Ts Madison, television and internet personality, LGBTQ+ activist
Alec Mapa, actor
Nicole Byer, comedian and actress
Dove Cameron, actress and singer
Andra Day, singer and actress
Dulcé Sloan, comedian

Special guests
Guests who appeared in episodes, but did not judge on the main stage.

Episodes 1 and 2
Albert Sanchez, photographer

Episode 4
Jennifer Lopez, singer, actress, dancer

Episode 5
Jaymes Mansfield, contestant on season nine
Kahmora Hall, contestant on season thirteen
Tempest DuJour, contestant on season seven
Sarah McLachlan, singer and songwriter

Episode 8
David Benjamin Steinberg, songwriter and music producer

Episode 10
Raven, runner-up of season two and of All Stars season one

Episode 12 
Leland, producer
Leslie Jordan, actor
Miguel Zarate, choreographer

Episode 13
Norvina, president of Anastasia Beverly Hills

Episode 15
LaLa Ri, contestant on season thirteen
Derrick Barry, contestant on season eight and All Stars season five
Kahanna Montrese, contestant on season eleven
Alexis Mateo, contestant on season three and All Stars season one and five

Episode 16
Jaida Essence Hall, winner of season twelve
Kameron Michaels, contestant on season ten
Trinity K. Bonet, contestant on season six and All Stars season six
Naomi Smalls, contestant on season eight and All Stars season four
Derrick Barry, contestant on season eight and All Stars season five
Kahanna Montrese, contestant on season eleven
Hot Chocolate, entertainer and drag queen
Symone, winner of season thirteen
LaLa Ri, contestant on and Miss Congeniality of season thirteen

Episodes

Ratings

References

2022 American television seasons
2022 in LGBT history
RuPaul's Drag Race seasons